YCS may refer to:
Chesterfield Inlet Airport (IATA code)
Ypsilanti Community Schools